The Argentina Olympic football team (Argentina U-23 since 1992) represents Argentina in international football competitions during Olympic Games and Pan American Games. The selection is limited to players under the age of 23, except three overage players. The team is controlled by the Argentine Football Association (AFA).

The first participation of Argentina in Olympic tournaments was in 1928, when the team was runner-up to champions Uruguay at the Games held in Amsterdam. By those times, rules stated that only amateur squads could compete, so Argentina (and also Uruguay) played with senior players so football was still not professional in those countries by then.

Argentina would not participate in Olympic Games until 1960 when the squad did a discrete performance finishing 7th. The team contested the competition with youth amateur players. After the IOC allowed professional players to participate (but with an age limit of 23 years old) Argentina returned in 1996 when the squad won their second silver medal after losing to Nigeria in the final. In 2004 and coached by Marcelo Bielsa, Argentina won their first gold medal with Carlos Tévez being also the top scorer with 8 goals. Four years later Argentina won their second gold medal in Beijing  taking revenge from Nigeria with a 1–0 win in the final.

History

First participation 

Argentina took part for the first time in the 1928 Olympic Games held in the Netherlands. Although the Olympics were restricted to amateur teams only, Argentina competed with its senior squad so football was not professional in the country until 1931. The team advanced to the final after defeating United States with a thrashing 11–2 in the first round, and Belgium (6–3) in the second. In the semi-finals, the national team smashed Egypt by 6–0 to qualify for the final against Uruguay.

The first match ended in a 1–1 tie so a second game had to be played three days later. In the decisive match, Uruguay won the tournament after defeating Argentina 2–1, winning the Gold Medal. The Argentine line-up was Bossio, Bidoglio, Paternóster, Médice, Monti, Evaristo, Carricaberri, Tarasconi, Ferreira, Perduca, Orsi. Tarasconi was also the topscorer of the competition with 11 goals.

1932–84: few participations 
In 1932 no football tournament was held, restarting the activities in 1936 (where Argentina did not take part), being interrupted due to World War II until 1948. Because of an agreement between FIFA and the IOC, only amateur players were allowed to play in the football tournaments from then on.

Argentina returned to football competition in the 1960 games held in Rome. The squad was eliminated in the first round after a 3–2 loss to Denmark, although the team won its successive games against Tunisia (2–1) and Poland (2–0). Argentina placed second to Denmark.

Argentina's next participation was at the 1964 Summer Olympics organized by Tokyo, where the team finished in the last position of the group after a 1–1 draw with Ghana and a 2–3 loss to Japan. Since then, Argentina had a long absence from the games, not having taken part in the 1968, 1972, 1976, 1980 and 1984 Olympics.

1988–92 
The national team returned for the 1988 Summer Olympics held in Seoul. The changes made by the IOC since 1984 (where Argentina did not participate) allowed the squad to include professional players in their lists, some of them with several years playing in Primera División, such as Luis Islas, Pedro Monzón, Néstor Fabbri, Darío Siviski and Jorge Comas, among others. In the group stage, Argentina tied 1–1 to the United States, then beat South Korea by 2–1, finishing second to the Soviet Union and qualifying to the next stage. In the quarter-finals, Argentina lost to Brazil 2–1, being eliminated from the competition.

Since the 1992 edition, the IOC stated that all football players should be under 23 years old, beyond they were professional or not. Coached by Alfio Basile, Argentina went to play the qualification tournament with experienced players such as Diego Simeone, Diego Latorre, Antonio Mohamed, Fernando Gamboa and Leonardo Astrada, who had also won the Copa América one year before. Nevertheless, Argentina failed to qualify for the games, finishing 3rd. in group B after Paraguay and Colombia therefore being eliminated in first round.

Since the 1996 Games, the IOC allowed squads to include a maximum of three over-23 players in their rosters.

Return to podium 

Argentina came back to the competition in the 1996 edition held in Atlanta, United States. For the first time in the history of the Olympics, the IOC allowed football representatives to register a maximum of three above-23 players. The Argentine players registered under that condition were Diego Simeone, José Chamot and Roberto Sensini. Former senior team captain Daniel Passarella was the manager.

The national team debuted with a 3–1 victory over the United States, then tied to Portugal and Tunisia, both 1–1, to finish first the group and qualify for the second round. In the quarter-finals, Argentina trashed Spain 4–0 which allowed the team to pass to the semi-finals, where it defeated Portugal 2–0. After 66 years since the first final played in Amsterdam, Argentina reached its second Olympic final. The match was played on 3 August 1996 and Argentina lost to Nigeria 2–3. The line-up for the final was: Cavallero; Javier Zanetti, Roberto Ayala, Roberto Sensini, José Chamot; Christian Bassedas, Matías Almeyda, Ariel Ortega, Hugo Morales; Claudio López and Hernán Crespo. Other players squad players included Carlos Bossio, Marcelo Gallardo and Marcelo Delgado. In the next edition of the Games, 2000, Argentina did not participate.

First gold 

The 2004 Summer Olympics were held in Athens and Argentina returned to the competition after the absence in Sydney. The squad, managed by Marcelo Bielsa, won the gold medal for the first time in its history. Before playing the final, Argentina won all the games in the first round, thrashing Serbia and Montenegro 6–0 then defeating Tunisia and Australia. Argentina finished first in the group with no goals conceded. In the quarter-finals, Argentina smashed Costa Rica 4–0, reaching the semi-finals against Italy which it beat 3–0. Argentina played the final against Paraguay on 28 August 2004, winning not only the game (1–0) but the gold medal as well.                                                               

Argentina won the competition with an astounding campaign, winning the six matches played, with no goals allowed during the tournament. The team also totaled 17 goals (2.83 per match). The line-up for the final was: Germán Lux; Fabricio Coloccini, Roberto Ayala, Gabriel Heinze; Lucho González, Javier Mascherano, Kily González, Andrés D'Alessandro, Carlos Tevez; Mauro Rosales and César Delgado. The most notable player of the tournament was Tevez, who finished as topscorer with eight goals.

Second gold 

The 2008 Summer Olympics were held in Beijing where Argentina, coached by former World Champion Sergio Batista, won their second consecutive gold medal. The squad debuted with a 2–1 victory over the Ivory Coast, then defeating Australia (1–0) and Serbia (2–0). In the knockout stage, Argentina eliminated the Netherlands (aet) by 2–1, thrashed Brazil by 3–0 and won the gold medal in the final match against Nigeria, 1–0.

Argentina won all the matches played (six), scoring 11 goals with only two conceded. Some of the most notable players of the tournament were Lionel Messi, Sergio Agüero, Ángel Di María, Éver Banega, Ezequiel Lavezzi, Fernando Gago and Pablo Zabaleta, who would all play for the senior team in successive years. 

The three over-23 years players were Juan Román Riquelme, Javier Mascherano and Nicolás Pareja.

2012–present 

Argentina failed to qualify for the 2012 Summer Olympics held in London. The 2011 South American U-20 Championship qualified the top two teams for the Olympics. Argentina failed to qualify in the final stage, finishing 3rd. after Brazil and Uruguay. 

For the 2016 competition held in Rio de Janeiro, most of the players called up for the squad were not given permission to play by their respective clubs, including Paulo Dybala, Mauro Icardi, Matías Kranevitter, Luciano Vietto, Ramiro Funes Mori and goalkeeper Augusto Batalla, among others. After the resignation of Gerardo Martino as coach, Julio Olarticoechea (who was the Argentina U-20 coach) was appointed to take over the team.                                                              

At Rio 2016, the squad debuted with a 2–0 loss to Portugal, then defeating Algeria 2–1. In the last fixture of group stage, Argentina drew 1–1 with Honduras, which caused the squad finished third in the group, not enough to qualify for the next round. Some of Argentina's players were Ángel Correa, Jonathan Calleri and Cristian Pavón.

In Tokyo 2020, Argentina debuted in group C with a 2–0 loss to Australia, then beating Egypt 1–0. The team tied 1–1 to Spain, finishing third in the group and failing to qualify to the next stage. Fernando Batista was the head coach. Like the previous edition in Rio, several clubs denied their players to play for Argentina, some examples were Gonzalo Montiel, Cristian Romero, Exequiel Palacios, Lautaro Martínez, Julián Álvarez, Lisandro Martínez, Nicolás Domínguez, Nicolás González, and Nahuel Molina (went on vacation after playing the 2020 Copa América); on the other hand, footballers playing for teams outside Argentine were not also allowed to play, such as Matías Zaracho, Nicolás Capaldo, Juan Foyth, Marcos Senesi, and Leonardo Balerdi. The large list of players denied also included over-23 players Carlos Izquierdoz, Enzo Pérez, Ángel Correa, Nacho Fernández, Sebastián Driussi, Agustín Marchesín, and Juan Musso.

Team image

Nicknames
The Argentina national under-23 football team has been known or nicknamed as the "Albicelestes (White and Sky blue)".

Home stadium
Argentina play its home matches on the Estadio Monumental Antonio Vespucio Liberti.

Rivalries

Brazil

The Argentina and Brazil national football teams are sporting rivals.

Results and fixtures

2021

Players

Current squad
 Final squad for the 2020 Summer Olympics was announced on 1 July 2021.

Caps and goals correct as of 28 July 2021.

Overage players in Olympic Games

Competitive record

Olympic Games

CONMEBOL Pre-Olympic Tournament

Pan American Games

Honours 
 Summer Olympics
 Gold Medal (2): 2004, 2008
  Silver Medal (2): 1928, 1996

 Pan American Games 
  Gold medal (7): 1951, 1955, 1959, 1975, 1995, 2003, 2019 
  Silver medal (2): 1963, 2011
  Bronze medal (3): 1975, 1979, 1987

 CONMEBOL Pre-Olympic Tournament
  Gold medal (5): 1960, 1964, 1980, 2004, 2020
  Silver medal (2): 1987, 1996
  Bronze medal (3): 1971, 1976, 2000

Records

Top goalscorers

Notes

References

Argentina national football team
South American national under-23 association football teams